Disulfur is the diatomic molecule with the formula S2.  It is analogous to the dioxygen molecule but rarely occurs at room temperature. This violet gas is the dominant species in hot sulfur vapors.  S2 is one of the minor components of the atmosphere of Io, which is predominantly composed of SO2. The instability of S2 is usually described in the context of the double bond rule.

Synthesis
This violet gas is generated by heating sulfur above 720 °C, comprising 99% of the vapor at low pressure (1 mm Hg) at 530 °C.
  
Disulfur can be produced when an atmosphere of COS is irradiated with UV light using a mercury photosensitizer or when CS2, H2S2, S2Cl2 or C2H4S, PSF3 or COS are irradiated.

Natural occurrence
Gaseous disulfur has been detected emanating from the surface of Jupiter's moon Io, from the vicinity of Pele volcano.

Properties
The ground state of S2 is a triplet: a diradical, with two unpaired electrons like O2 and SO.  It has the S-S bond length of 189 pm, much shorter than the S-S single bonds in S8, which are 206 pm long.  Its Raman spectrum consists of a band at 715 cm−1. The corresponding O-O band for O2 is found at 1556 cm−1. The S-S bond energy is 430 kJ/mol compared to 498 kJ/mol for O2.

Disulfur readily photodissociates, with a mean lifespan of 7.5 min in sunlight.

References

External links

Allotropes of sulfur
Homonuclear diatomic molecules
Gases with color